Nomu may refer to:
 Nomu (film), a 1974 Telugu devotional film
 Nomu language, a Papuan language of Morobe Province, Papua New Guinea
 Nomu (song), by Toronto band Good Kid, 2020
 Nomu, the mindless "artificial human" creations from My Hero Academia